Daniel Schärer (born 20 October 1985) is a retired Swiss discus thrower.

He finished eleventh at the 2007 European U23 Championships. He also competed at the 2007 Universiade and the 2009 World Championships without reaching the final.

His personal best throw was 63.55 metres, achieved in May 2009 in Eugene, Oregon.

References

1985 births
Living people
Swiss male discus throwers
World Athletics Championships athletes for Switzerland